Wetthegan Wildlife Sanctuary is a protected area in Myanmar's Magway Region with an area of  at an elevation of . It was established in 1939.
The sanctuary's  lake and surrounding marshland provide habitat for waterfowl and freshwater fish. It is one of four protected wetlands in the country.

History 
The sanctuary was notified in September 1939 under the name of 'Weltigan Wild Life Sanctuary' with an area of  foremost for the protection of waterfowl. It consisted of a lake and marshland. Local people were allowed to graze their cattle, collect grass, fruits and lotus leaves. Birds and fish were poached during the Japanese occupation of Burma. By the early 1950s, the area was partly rehabilitated.
Today, it is governed by the Township Forest Department and does not receive a budget for conservation activities.

Biodiversity
Wetthegan Wildlife Sanctuary comprises a lake of about  surrounded by marshes, where 22 aquatic plant species were recorded. These include Typha, Eichhornia, Sesbania, Nymphaea and Boottia species. Medicinal plants comprise 80 species.

Birds recorded comprise 130 species, with ducks and waders predominating between November and February. Waterfowl include lesser whistling duck (Dendrocygna javanica), ferruginous pochard (Aythya nyroca), bar-headed goose (Anser indicus) and pheasant-tailed jacana (Hydrophasianus chirurgus). Also recorded were hooded treepie (Crypsirina cucullata), Ayeyarwady bulbul (Pycnonotus blanfordi), common myna (Acridotheres tristis), white-throated babbler (Argya gularis), Asian palm swift (Cypsiurus balasiensis).
Little grebe (Tachybaptus ruficollis), cinnamon bittern (Ixobrychus cinnamomeus), cattle egret (Bubulcus ibis), knob-billed duck (Sarkidiornis melanotos), cotton pygmy goose (Nettapus coromandelianus), Indian spot-billed duck (Anas poecilorhyncha), Western swamphen (Porphyrio porphyrio), black-winged stilt (Himantopus himantopus) and little ringed plover (Charadrius dubius) were also sighted.
Indian black turtle (Melanochelys trijuga), Indian flapshell turtle (Lissemys punctata) and Asiatic softshell turtle (Amyda cartilaginea) live in the lake.

References

Protected areas of Myanmar
Protected areas established in 1939
Magway Region